Enrile, officially the Municipality of Enrile,  is a 3rd class municipality in the province of Cagayan, Philippines. According to the 2020 census, it has a population of 36,705 people.

Enrile lies on the southernmost part of Cagayan, bounded by Sta. Maria, Isabela to the south, by the mighty Cagayan River  to the east, by Solana and Tuguegarao to the north, Kalinga to the west.

The town is predominantly an agricultural town where the majority of its population derive their income from farming. It has a land area of 18,450 hectares unevenly distributed to the 22-barangays of the municipality. Its main products are rice, corn, peanut, tobacco and vegetables.

It has a total population of 35,834 inhabitants. Its citizens are called Itawit because they speak the Itawit dialect. Ilocanos and Tagalogs have settled at the western barangays and have blended very well in the mainstream of Itawit life.

Etymology
The municipality was named after Spanish Governor-General Pasqual Enrile y Alcedo. Cabug was the original name of Enrile when it was a barrio of Tuguegarao. It was established as a separate town in September 1849 and named in honor of the Spanish Governor General Pascual Enrile during the Spanish regime.

History 
The History of Enrile dates as early as 1690. According to Father Juan Paguere, it was just a wide and long stretch of virgin land located at the southernmost end of the province of Cagayan. In 1718, the Govierno Superior ordered the place to become one of the barrios of Tuguegarao. It was named "Cabugag" or in short Cabug, the dialect term for hunchback for the first settler was a man with this deformity. So the place was named after him. The name "Cabug" is engraved on the town's first church bell which is still found in the steeple.

In 1724, The Dominican Friars have thought of giving the barrios their Patron Saint. Cabug was given "Nuestra Señora de las Caldas". The old prominent residents of the barrio had chosen the sixth day of August as her feast day. As year went by, the land area and population of the barrio increased with surprising rapidly. The Cagayan River which flowed close to the barrio site gradually changed its course and moved further towards Cataggaman as flood plains were formed. The non Christian inhabitants called Kalingas gradually deserted the barrio and moved westward to the Mountain Province. As a result, more agricultural lands were cleared and cultivated. Tobacco and corn are the chief crops of the people.

In September 1849, the Govierno Superior ordered the separation of Cabug from the municipality of Tuguegarao to become a town by itself. The new town was named Enrile in honor of Governor Pascual Enrile who was responsible for building roads in the northern part of Luzon during those days. The separation of Enrile from Tuguegarao led to a change of its patron saint. The population unanimously adopted "Nuestra Señora de las Nieves" as its patron Saint. The fifth day of August was selected as her feast day. Since then the feast day had always been celebrated pompously.

According to Father Julian Malumbres in his Historia de Cagayan, the name "Cabug" was first recorded in the official documents of the Dominican Fathers on January 20, 1849. However the town was known as "Cabug" even up 1863 when the name Enrile was officially written and road in the official documents of the Dominican Fathers. Cabug was the original name of Enrile when it was a barrio of Tuguegarao. It was established as a separate town in September 1849 and named in honor of the Spanish Governor General Pascual Enrile during the Spanish regime.

Enrile lies on the southernmost part of Cagayan, bounded by Sta. Maria, Isabela to the south, by the mighty Cagayan River  to the east, by Solana, Cagayan and Tuguegarao to the north, Kalinga (province) to the west.

Enrile is predominantly an agricultural town where the majority of its population derive their income from farming. It has a land area of 18,450 hectares unevenly distributed to the 22-barangays of the municipality. Its main products are rice, corn, peanut, tobacco and vegetables.

Enrile has a total population of 29,719 inhabitants. Its citizens are called Itawit because they speak the Itawit dialect. Ilocanos and Tagalogs have settled at the western barangays and have blended very well in the mainstream of Itawit life.

In 1690, the town of Enrile was a virgin forest on the southernmost portion of the province of Cagayan.

In 1724 or thereabouts, it was named Cabug, a barrio of Tuguegarao City and it now celebrates its feast day on August 6, later changed to August 5, in honor of its Patron Saint Nuestra Senoŕa de las Caldas.

In the chronicle of Fray Julian Manumbres, Cabug as a geographical unit was officially recorded on January 20, 1849. And although the name Enrile was officially written and read in the records of the Dominicans up to 1863, the town of Enrile was still known as "Cabug".

Kalingas, the early settlers, were later joined by neighbor inhabitants in the cleaning and cultivating its rich soil. They plowed and planted the fields with staple products and tobacco.

With the increasing production and number of educated elders, the Gobierno Superior proclaimed "Cabug" separated from Tuguegarao City in 1849, with a new patroness named Nuestra Senoŕa de las Nieves.

This proclaimed "Cabug" as "Enrile" in honor of Gobernardo General Pascual Enrile, who was responsible for the construction of Luzon's highways.

Sinupac, a hinterland of Enrile, was the hiding place of Emilio Aguinaldo and his revolutionary forces when they retreated from pursuing American forces.

Geography 
Enrile lies on the southernmost part of Cagayan, bounded by Sta. Maria, Isabela to the south, by the mighty Cagayan River to the east, by Solana and Tuguegarao City to the north and by the province of Kalinga to the west.

Barangays 
Enrile is politically subdivided into 22 barangays. These barangays are headed by elected officials: Barangay Captain, Barangay Council, whose members are called Barangay Councilors. All are elected every three years.

Climate

Land Area 
Enrile has a land area of 18,450 hectares unevenly distributed to the 22 barangays of the municipality and predominantly agricultural where the majority of its inhabitants derive their income from farming.

Topography 
Enrile is bounded by hills and mountains on both North and West. Area with low elevation is about 20 meters above sea level at the Eastern part which lies close to the river boundaries. The highest elevation is found Northwest which is approximately 800 meters above sea level.

Demographics

Economy

Peanut Production 
The Department of Agriculture (DA) has declared the town of Enrile in Cagayan as the "peanut capital of the Philippines" for its "noteworthy contribution" to the development of the local peanut industry.

Agriculture Secretary Proceso Alcala declared it so following the presentation of evidence of the significant contributions of the town to the peanut industry in the country. DA Assistant Secretary for Agribusiness Leandro Gazmin, who went to Enrile to represent Alcala during the peanut harvest ceremony, said the soil suitability of the town – sandy to sandy-loam – and its unique ability to produce peanut year-round are the "primary reasons why it will be known as an important source of peanut henceforth."

Gazmin said the Secretary lauds them for their collective effort but that the DA chief requests that they "commit themselves to improve and develop even further not just the peanut industry but the entire agricultural sector as well."

He said the Secretary is also happy to know that farmers have been receptive to new technologies hence, they are able to increase productivity from 1.5 to 1.8 tons per hectare.

During the peanut harvest, the DA regional office turned over to the local government of Enrile over P4-million worth of farm machineries and equipment, including one unit four-wheel drive tractor, four units of mill for corngrits, 10 heads of carabao, 2,500 kilos of peanut seeds for planting and 300 bags of open-pollinated corn variety.

Though peanut is considered a high value crop by DA, not just in Enrile but in neighboring towns of Peñablanca and Tuguegarao (Cagayan) and Sta. Maria and Cabagan in Isabela, the former was chosen as "number one" for having the "highest production share of 1,800 metric tons per year or 8 to10 percent of the national supply."

Also, Enrile is the only municipality that can cultivate peanuts during the dry and wet season cropping, the DA said.

DA Region II Executive Director Lucrecio Alviar said that per cropping, the town of Enrile is able to produce a big chunk of the national production, making it the major source of raw materials for various peanut-based products processed and sold in Metro Manila.

Enrile is home to 800 peanut farmers cultivating 700 hectares of farmlands with a potential expansion area of another 800 hectares. "With improved production and yield, Enrile may be able to fill up a portion, if not all, of the import requirement for peanut of 15,060 metric tons," Alviar added.

With the use of technology from DA and the Department of Science and Technology (DOST) – particularly the use of improved varieties and fertilizers like Boron and Gypsum – the DA is optimistic that "peanut production could reach an all-time high of 3.25 tons per hectare," or an increase of 200 percent over its current average. The DA said it hopes the farmers can sustain their productivity.

Gazmin also encouraged peanut farmers to bring their harvest to the Isabela Agri-Pinoy Trading Center, where they can directly sell their produce. The Isabela APTC is part of the government's effort to empower farmers to become traders to enhance their incomes, stabilize food prices and encourage them to produce more. "Let us utilize the center as a venue for cooperativism" and enabling each other to produce and earn more, he said.

Local Business 
 Agro - Trade Fair located at the side of Municipal Hall.
 Kimikarlai - Turingan Sports Center and Airconditioned Cockpit Arena (Bunagan St.)
 Kimikarlai Construction Supply and Services (Santiago - Tuguegarao Road)
 Kimikarlai Gamefarm (Bunagan St.)
 Kimikarlai Hardware and Construction Services (Brgy. Villa Maria)
 Lai Gasoline Station (Brgy. Villa Maria)
 Lai Gasoline Station (Santiago - Tuguegarao Road)
 Lai Grains and Palay Gasoline Station (Bunagan St.)
 M.B. Decena Jr. Livestock

Transportation 
Passenger jeepneys, tricycles and other private transportation vehicles service all routes within and outside Enrile. Kalesa is also driven within the Poblacion and barangays only.

Government
Enrile, belonging to the third legislative district of the province of Cagayan, is governed by a mayor designated as its local chief executive and by a municipal council as its legislative body in accordance with the Local Government Code. The mayor, vice mayor, and the councilors are elected directly by the people through an election which is being held every three years.

Elected officials

Elected officials

Local chief executives

Gobernadorcillos 
A. Spanish Regime – 1849 to 1896

 Don Vicente Bunagan
 Don Marcelo Guzman
 Don Martin Fortunato
 Don Lorenzo de los Reyes
 Don Pio Cepeda
 Don Mariano Guzman
 Don Carlos Argonza
 Don Agapito Lappay
 Don Pedro Bunagan
 Don Vicente Carag
 Don Patricio Gacutan
 Don Cayatano Fortunato

Municipal Captain 
1. Don Cornelio Bunagan – 1896 – 1898

Municipal Mayors 

 Vicente Babaran         1900-1902
 Tomas Carag               1902-1903
 Matias Bunagan         1903-1904
 Agapito Guzman         1904-1906
 Cipriano Pagulayan           1906-1909
 Vicente Babaran              1909-1913
 Nicolas Pauig                1913-1917
 Generoso Palattao             1917-1920
 Pedro Camigad                   1920-1924
 Jacinto Camacam               1924-1926
 Francisco Turingan           1926-1931
 Joaquin Accad                     1931-1935
 Felix Babaran                     1935-1943
 Rufino Luyun                       1943-1945(Japanese Regime)
 Agustin Palattao                 March 1945 to June 30, 1945 (Military)
 Anastacio Luyun                 1945-1946 (Appointed)
 Jose Babaran                     1947-1951
 Gorgenio Manauis             January 1, 1952, to March 27, 1952
 Benigno Carag                   Serving the rest of the term of Mayor Manauis (deceased), he being the elected Vice Mayor.

Education
The Schools Division of Cagayan governs the town's public education system. The division office is a field office of the DepEd in Cagayan Valley region. The office governs the public and private elementary and public and private high schools throughout the municipality.

References

External links
[ Philippine Standard Geographic Code]
Philippine Census Information

Municipalities of Cagayan
Populated places on the Rio Grande de Cagayan